Rear Admiral Makanju Mackson Kadiri, Gss, psc, fdc, is navy Navigation and Direction officer. He is appointed as the Commandant National Defence College Nigeria in 2019 served till his retirement in 30 March 2021. 
He previously served as the Chief of Training and Operations at Naval headquarters, Abuja from 2018 to 2019. He served until his retirement in 30 March 2021, he was replaced by Rear Admiral Oladele Bamidele Daji.

He attended the senior staff course at the Marine Safety Course U.S, Armed Forces Command and Staff College Jaji, United States Coast Guard Training Centre and the United Nations Administration and Logistic Course  in the International Peace Support Centre Nairobi, he also obtained a master's degree in political science.

Mackson was enlisted into in 1988 Navy as a Regular Combatant of the rank Sub Lieutenant. He became Rear Admiral in 2015 after attending several professional academic courses.

Kadiri served on the Nigeria Navy Ships; the Ambe, Agu, Ofiom and RuwanYaro. He was a commanding officer of the Forward Operating Base, directing staff of the Armed Forces Command and Staff College and the National Defence College Nigeria. He had served in the Maritime Warfare at the Armed Forces Command and Staff College as a department director and was also Navy Secretary at the Naval Headquarters, Abuja. He also attended many international conferences, he was a Senior Leaders at the 2016 Gulf of Guinea Commission Summit Malabo, Symposium Abidjan in 2017 and the 2018 Gulf of Guinea Navies Summit, Paris.

References

External links 

 
 
 
 

Year of birth missing (living people)
Nigerian Navy officers
Nigerian military personnel
Nigerian military officers
Living people